Gert-Jan Kok is a Grand Prix motorcycle racer from Netherlands.

Career statistics

By season

Races by year
(key)

References

External links

1986 births
Living people
Dutch motorcycle racers
125cc World Championship riders
21st-century Dutch people